Andersen's naked-backed fruit bat or Andersen's bare-backed fruit bat (Dobsonia anderseni) is a large cave-dwelling species of megabat in the family Pteropodidae. It is endemic to the Bismarck Archipelago including the Admiralty Islands in Papua New Guinea.

Taxonomy and etymology
It was described as a new species in 1914 by British zoologist Oldfield Thomas. The holotype used to describe the species was collected by Albert Stewart Meek and his brother-in-law, Albert Frederic Eichhorn, in October 1913. The eponym for the species name "anderseni" is Danish mammalogist Knud Andersen. Of Andersen, Thomas wrote: "I have named the species in honour of Dr. K. Andersen, in recognition of the striking monograph of Dobsonia contained in his Catalogue, a monograph which has entirely revolutionized our knowledge of the group."

Description
Its fur is very dark brown, with its head nearly black.

Range and habitat
Its range includes several islands of Papua New Guinea.

Conservation
As of 2020, it is listed as a least-concern species by the IUCN. Threats to this species include overharvesting for bushmeat or disturbance of the caves where it roosts during the day.

References

Dobsonia
Mammals of Papua New Guinea
Mammals described in 1914
Bats of Oceania
Taxa named by Oldfield Thomas
Bats of New Guinea